Union Sportive Joué-lès-Tours was a French football club founded in 1942. The club dissolved in 2008 when they and ASC Joué Touraine merged to form Joué-lès-Tours FCT. They were based in the town of Joué-lès-Tours, Indre-et-Loire and their home stadium was the Stade Jean Bouin. In the 1982–83 season, the side were crowned champions of the Division d'Honneur de Centre, the sixth tier of French football.

External links
 US Joué-lès-Tours club information 

Defunct football clubs in France
Association football clubs established in 1942
Association football clubs disestablished in 2008
1942 establishments in France
2008 disestablishments in France
Sport in Indre-et-Loire
Football clubs in Centre-Val de Loire